The Fakt Marathi Cine Sanman are annual awards presented by the Fakt Marathi television network to honour both artistic and technical excellence in the Marathi-language film industry of India. The Awards were presented for the first time on 27 July 2022, at The Club in Andheri. The members of the jury select the winners. The awards are divided into two categories: popular awards and technical awards. The ceremony is televised on the Marathi television network Fakt Marathi.

Jury members

Hosts

Award categories

Popular awards 

 Best Film
 Best Director
 Best Actor in a Lead Role
 Best Actress in a Lead Role
 Best Actor in a Supporting Role
 Best Actress in a Supporting Role
 Best Performance in a Comic Role
 Best Performance in a Negative Role
 Best Playback Singer Male
 Best Playback Singer Female
 Best Music Director
 Best Lyricist

Technical awards 

 Best Story
 Best Dialogue
 Best Screenplay
 Best Cinematographer

Special Awards

See also 

 1st Fakt Marathi Cine Sanman
 Marathi cinema
 Cinema of India

References 

Indian film awards
Film industry in Mumbai
Marathi cinema
Maharashtra awards